Marquês de Pombal is an interchange station where the Blue and Yellow Lines of the Lisbon Metro connect, being located on Praça Marquês de Pombal.

History
The Blue Line station is one of the 11 stations that belong to the original Lisbon Metro network, opened on 29 December 1959. The architectural design of the original Blue Line station is by Falcão e Cunha.

On 15 July 1995 the Yellow Line station was built, based on the architectural design of José Santa-Rita and João Santa-Rita, and the Blue Line station was extended and refurbished, based on the architectural design of Duarte Nuno Simões and Nuno Simões.

Connections

Urban buses

Carris 
 702 Marquês de Pombal ⇄ Serafina (Rua da Igreja)
 711 Terreiro do Paço ⇄ Alto da Damaia
 712 Estação de Santa Apolónia ⇄ Alcântara Mar (Museu do Oriente)
 720 Picheleira/Rua Faria Vasconcelos ⇄ Calvário
 723 Desterro ⇄ Algés
 727 Estação Roma-Areeiro ⇄ Restelo - Avenida das Descobertas
 732 Marquês de Pombal ⇄ Caselas
 736 Cais do Sodré ⇄ Odivelas (Bairro Dr. Lima Pimentel)
 738 Quinta dos Barros ⇄ Alto de Santo Amaro
 744 Marquês de Pombal ⇄ Moscavide (Quinta das Laranjeiras)
 783 Amoreiras (Centro Comercial) ⇄ Portela - Rua Mouzinho de Albuquerque

Aerobus 
 Linha 1 Aeroporto ⇄ Cais do Sodré
 Linha 2 Aeroporto ⇄ Sete Rios

Suburban buses

Transportes Sul do Tejo 
 151 Lisboa (Marquês de Pombal) ⇄ Charneca de Caparica (Solmar)
 155 Lisboa (Marquês de Pombal) ⇄ Costa de Caparica
 169 Santa Maria do Pinhal ⇄ Lisboa (Marquês de Pombal) (via Feijó)

Vimeca / Lisboa Transportes 
 007 Lisboa (Marquês de Pombal) ⇄ Carnaxide (Hospital de Santa Cruz)
 011 Linda-a-Velha ⇄ Lisboa (Marquês de Pombal)
 013 Linda-a-Velha ⇄ Lisboa (Marquês de Pombal) ⇄ Queluz de Baixo (via Carnaxide/Queijas)´´´´015´´ lisbon <<Marquês De Pombal-Urbanização De S.Marcos
 185 Amadora (Hospital) ⇄ Lisboa (Marquês de Pombal)

See also
 List of Lisbon metro stations

References

External links

Blue Line (Lisbon Metro) stations
Yellow Line (Lisbon Metro) stations
Railway stations opened in 1959